The acronym CEPR may refer to:

 Centre for Economic Policy Research, a London-based European network of economists, founded in 1983
 Center for Economic and Policy Research, a progressive think tank in Washington, D.C., founded in 1999
 Centre for Emergency Preparedness and Response, a subagency of the Public Health Agency of Canada
 Centre for Emergency Preparedness and Response, a subagency of the Health Protection Agency in the United Kingdom